The Ireland women's cricket team played four Women's One Day Internationals (WODIs) against the Zimbabwe women's cricket team in October 2021. The matches were used by both teams for their preparation for the 2021 Women's Cricket World Cup Qualifier tournament, also in Zimbabwe. They were the first WODI matches to be played by Ireland since June 2018, when they hosted New Zealand, and the first ever WODI matches to be played by Zimbabwe since they were granted WODI status by the International Cricket Council (ICC) in April 2021.

Zimbabwe won the opening match of the series by four wickets, with their captain Mary-Anne Musonda scoring an unbeaten century. Ireland won the second match by 80 runs to level the series. Ireland won the third WODI by eight wickets to go 2–1 in the series with one match to play. Ireland then won the final match by 85 runs to win the series 3–1. In the final match, Ireland's Amy Hunter became the youngest player, male or female, to score an ODI century.

Squads

WODI series

1st WODI

2nd WODI

3rd WODI

4th WODI

References

External links
 Series home at ESPN Cricinfo

Ireland 2021–22
Zimbabwe 2021–22
International cricket competitions in 2021–22
2021 in Irish cricket
2021 in Zimbabwean cricket
2021 in women's cricket